This is a list of Tony Award winners and nominees who are of Asian descent or native to an Asian country. As of the 75th Tony Awards, which were presented on June 12, 2022, there are 14 individual Asian Tony Award winners, including 13 competitive award winners. The first Asian to win a Tony Award was Willa Kim in 1981 when she won the Tony Award for Best Costume Design in a Musical for Sophisticated Ladies.

Show and technical

Best Musical

Best Revival of a Musical

Best Direction of a Musical

Best Book of a Musical

Best Original Score

Best Orchestrations

Best Choreography

Best Scenic Design in a Musical

Best Costume Design in a Musical

Best Lighting Design in a Musical

Best Sound Design of a Musical

Best Play

Best Revival of a Play

Best Direction of a Play

Best Scenic Design in a Play

Best Costume Design in a Play

Best Lighting Design in a Play

Best Sound Design of a Play

Performance

Best Performance by a Leading Actor in a Play

Best Performance by a Leading Actress in a Play

Best Performance by a Featured Actor in a Play

Best Performance by a Featured Actress in a Play

Best Performance by a Leading Actor in a Musical

Best Performance by a Leading Actress in a Musical

Best Performance by a Featured Actor in a Musical

Best Performance by a Featured Actress in a Musical

Special awards

Special Tony Award / Lifetime Achievement Award

Tony Honors for Excellence in Theatre

Isabelle Stevenson Award

See also 
 List of Asian Academy Award winners and nominees
 List of Academy Award winners and nominees of Asian descent
 List of Asian Golden Globe winners and nominees

References

External links 
 Tony Awards Official Website

Asian-American theatre
Lists of award winners
Lists of Asian people